Revival is a 2013 comedy film written and directed by Alice Nellis and starring Bolek Polívka, Marián Geišberg, Karel Heřmánek and Miroslav Krobot. The film won the Audience Award at the 48th Karlovy Vary International Film Festival in 2013. Revival received 11 nominations at the 2013 Czech Lion Awards, but did not win in any categories.

Cast 
 Bolek Polívka as Václav
 Miroslav Krobot as Karel
 Karel Heřmánek as Milan
 Marián Geišberg as Otakar
 Zuzana Bydžovská as Yvonne
 Jenovéfa Boková as Miriam
 Lucie Žáčková
 Vojtěch Dyk as Vojta
 Jana Hubinská as Libuška

References

External links 

2013 comedy films
2013 films
Czech comedy films
2010s Czech-language films